The 1984 Women's World Chess Championship was won by Maia Chiburdanidze, who successfully defended her title against challenger Irina Levitina.

1982 Interzonals

As part of the qualification process, two Interzonal tournaments were held, one in Bad Kissingen in July and the other in Tbilisi in September 1982, featuring the best players from each FIDE zone. A total of 31 players took part, with the top three from each Interzonal qualifying for the Candidates Tournament.

In Bad Kissingen, ex-champion Gaprindashvili took first place and qualified along with Semenova and Lematschko.

Mureşan won in Tbilisi, ahead of Levitina and Liu (the first Chinese player to qualify for a Candidates Tournament).

{| class="wikitable"
|+ 1982 Women's Interzonal, Bad Kissingen
|-
! !! Player !! 1 !! 2 !! 3 !! 4 !! 5 !! 6 !! 7 !! 8 !! 9 !! 10 !! 11 !! 12 !! 13 !! 14 !! 15 !! 16 !! Points !! Tie break
|- style="background:#ccffcc;"
| 1 ||  || - || 0 || ½ || ½ || 1 || ½ || 1 || 1 || ½ || 1 || 1 || 1 || 1 || 1 || 1 || 1 || 12 || 
|- style="background:#ccffcc;"
| 2 ||  || 1 || - || ½ || 1 || 1 || ½ || 0 || 1 || 1 || ½ || ½ || 1 || 1 || 1 || ½ || 1 || 11½ || 
|- style="background:#ccffcc;"
| 3 ||  || ½ || ½ || - || 0 || ½ || 1 || 1 || ½ || ½ || 1 || 1 || 1 || 1 || ½ || 1 || 1 || 11 || 
|-
| 4 ||  || ½ || 0 || 1 || - || 0 || 1 || ½ || 1 || 1 || ½ || 1 || 1 || ½ || ½ || 1 || 1 || 10½ || 69.00
|-
| 5 ||  || 0 || 0 || ½ || 1 || - || 0 || ½ || ½ || 1 || 1 || 1 || 1 || 1 || 1 || 1 || 1 || 10½ || 62.25
|-
| 6 ||  || ½ || ½ || 0 || 0 || 1 || - || ½ || 0 || 1 || 1 || 1 || ½ || 1 || 1 || 1 || 1 || 10 || 
|-
| 7 ||  || 0 || 1 || 0 || ½ || ½ || ½ || - || ½ || ½ || 1 || ½ || 1 || ½ || 1 || 1 || 1 || 9½ || 
|-
| 8 ||  || 0 || 0 || ½ || 0 || ½ || 1 || ½ || - || 0 || ½ || ½ || ½ || 1 || ½ || ½ || 1 || 7 || 44.75
|-
| 9 ||  || ½ || 0 || ½ || 0 || 0 || 0 || ½ || 1 || - || 0 || 1 || 0 || 1 || ½ || 1 || 1 || 7 || 40.75
|-
| 10 ||  || 0 || ½ || 0 || ½ || 0 || 0 || 0 || ½ || 1 || - || 1 || 1 || 1 || 0 || ½ || 1 || 7 || 40.00
|-
| 11 ||  || 0 || ½ || 0 || 0 || 0 || 0 || ½ || ½ || 0 || 0 || - || 1 || 1 || ½ || 1 || 0 || 5 || 
|-
| 12 ||  || 0 || 0 || 0 || 0 || 0 || ½ || 0 || ½ || 1 || 0 || 0 || - || 0 || ½ || 1 || 1 || 4½ || 23.50
|-
| 13 ||  || 0 || 0 || 0 || ½ || 0 || 0 || ½ || 0 || 0 || 0 || 0 || 1 || - || 1 || ½ || 1 || 4½ || 23.00
|-
| 14 ||  || 0 || 0 || ½ || ½ || 0 || 0 || 0 || ½ || ½ || 1 || ½ || ½ || 0 || - || 0 || 0 || 4 || 
|-
| 15 ||  || 0 || ½ || 0 || 0 || 0 || 0 || 0 || ½ || 0 || ½ || 0 || 0 || ½ || 1 || - || 0 || 3 || 19.00
|-
| 16 ||  || 0 || 0 || 0 || 0 || 0 || 0 || 0 || 0 || 0 || 0 || 1 || 0 || 0 || 1 || 1 || - || 3 || 12.00
|}

{| class="wikitable"
|+ 1982 Women's Interzonal, Tbilisi
|-
! !! Player !! 1 !! 2 !! 3 !! 4 !! 5 !! 6 !! 7 !! 8 !! 9 !! 10 !! 11 !! 12 !! 13 !! 14 !! 15 !! Points !! Tie break
|- style="background:#ccffcc;"
| 1 ||  || - || ½ || 1 || 1 || 1 || ½ || ½ || 1 || 0 || ½ || 1 || 1 || ½ || 1 || 1 || 10½ || 
|- style="background:#ccffcc;"
| 2 ||  || ½ || - || ½ || ½ || 1 || ½ || ½ || ½ || 1 || ½ || ½ || ½ || 1 || 1 || 1 || 9½ || 
|- style="background:#ccffcc;"
| 3 ||  || 0 || ½ || - || ½ || 0 || ½ || 0 || 1 || 1 || 1 || ½ || 1 || 1 || 1 || 1 || 9 || 
|-
| 4 ||  || 0 || ½ || ½ || - || ½ || 1 || 1 || ½ || ½ || 0 || 1 || ½ || ½ || ½ || 1 || 8 || 51.75
|-
| 5 ||  || 0 || 0 || 1 || ½ || - || 0 || 1 || 1 || 0 || ½ || 1 || 1 || ½ || 1 || ½ || 8 || 51.50
|-
| 6 ||  || ½ || ½ || ½ || 0 || 1 || - || ½ || 0 || 0 || 1 || 1 || ½ || 1 || ½ || 1 || 8 || 51.00
|-
| 7 ||  || ½ || ½ || 1 || 0 || 0 || ½ || - || 1 || ½ || ½ || ½ || ½ || ½ || ½ || 1 || 7½ || 49.75
|-
| 8 ||  || 0 || ½ || 0 || ½ || 0 || 1 || 0 || - || 1 || 1 || 1 || 0 || 1 || ½ || 1 || 7½ || 45.75
|-
| 9 ||  || 1 || 0 || 0 || ½ || 1 || 1 || ½ || 0 || - || ½ || 0 || 0 || 1 || ½ || 1 || 7 || 
|-
| 10 ||  || ½ || ½ || 0 || 1 || ½ || 0 || ½ || 0 || ½ || - || ½ || ½ || ½ || ½ || 1 || 6½ || 41.75
|-
| 11 ||  || 0 || ½ || ½ || 0 || 0 || 0 || ½ || 0 || 1 || ½ || - || ½ || 1 || 1 || 1 || 6½ || 37.50
|-
| 12 ||  || 0 || ½ || 0 || ½ || 0 || ½ || ½ || 1 || 1 || ½ || ½ || - || ½ || 0 || 0 || 5½ || 
|-
| 13 ||  || ½ || 0 || 0 || ½ || ½ || 0 || ½ || 0 || 0 || ½ || 0 || ½ || - || 1 || 1 || 5 || 29.50
|-
| 14 ||  || 0 || 0 || 0 || ½ || 0 || ½ || ½ || ½ || ½ || ½ || 0 || 1 || 0 || - || 1 || 5 || 29.25
|-
| 15 ||  || 0 || 0 || 0 || 0 || ½ || 0 || 0 || 0 || 0 || 0 || 0 || 1 || 0 || 0 || - || 1½ || 
|}

1983-84 Candidates matches
The six qualifiers from the Interzonals were joined by two seeded players: Alexandria, who had lost the last championship match, and Ioseliani, who had lost the previous Candidates final.

These eight players contested a knock-out series of matches. Levitina won the final, earning the right to challenge the reigning champion for the title.

1984 Championship Match

The championship match was played in Volgograd in 1984. Unlike the previous match three years before, champion Chiburdanidze had no problems this time. She beat challenger Levitina with a comfortable margin of three points and retained her title

{| class="wikitable" style="text-align:center"
|+Women's World Championship Match 1984
|-
! !! 1 !! 2 !! 3 !! 4 !! 5 !! 6 !! 7 !! 8 !! 9 !! 10 !! 11 !! 12 !! 13 !! 14 !! Total
|-
| align=left | 
| ½ ||style="background:black; color:white"| ½ || 1 ||style="background:black; color:white"| 0 || ½ ||style="background:black; color:white"| ½ || ½ ||style="background:black; color:white"| 1 || 0 ||style="background:black; color:white"| 0 || ½ ||style="background:black; color:white"| 0 || 0 ||style="background:black; color:white"| ½ || 5½
|-
| align=left | 
|style="background:black; color:white"| ½ || ½ ||style="background:black; color:white"| 0 || 1 ||style="background:black; color:white"| ½ || ½ ||style="background:black; color:white"| ½ || 0 ||style="background:black; color:white"| 1 || 1 ||style="background:black; color:white"| ½ || 1 ||style="background:black; color:white"| 1 || ½ ||8½
|}

References

Women's World Chess Championships
1984 in chess